War in the Kitchen is a Romanian film drama by Marius Theodor Barna. The film was produced in 2001 by Ager Film in collaboration with Televiziunea Română (TVR). It stars Gheorghe Dinică as the main actor.

External links

2001 films
2000s Romanian-language films
2001 drama films
Romanian drama films